Call of the Cuckoo (1927) is a Hal Roach two reel silent film released by Metro-Goldwyn-Mayer. The film's principal star is comedian Max Davidson, though the film is just as well known for cameos from other Roach stars at the time. These cameos include renowned supporting player Jimmy Finlayson (the source of Homer Simpson's "D'oh!" catchphrase), the oft underrated/ignored Charley Chase, and a pre-teaming Stan Laurel and Oliver Hardy.

Plot
Papa Gimplewart (Davidson) exchanges his house, in order to escape the antics of inmates of the lunatic asylum next door, including characters played by Laurel and Hardy. Unfortunately, the new house turns out to be 'Jerry-built', put up in two days. After several disasters occur, Papa Gimplewart asks "Is there anything else can happen?". He then realizes that the inmates from the asylum have just moved in next door.

Among the disasters are a mop removing the color from the kitchen floor;dirty bath water leaking down from upstairs and into the communal coffeepot;and a piano sliding on an uneven floor that crashes through a wall and demolishes the family car.

Excerpts from this film appeared in the Robert Youngson documentary LAUREL AND HARDY'S LAUGHING 20's(1965)

Cast
Jimmy Finlayson 
Charley Chase
Max Davidson
Lillian Elliott
Stan Laurel
Oliver Hardy
Spec O'Donnell
Leo Willis 
Frank Brownlee
Edgar Dearing
Otto Fries 
Charlie Hall 
Fay Holderness 
Charles Meakin
Lyle Tayo

See also 
 List of American films of 1927
 1927 in film

References

External links 

1927 films
1927 comedy films
Silent American comedy films
American silent short films
American black-and-white films
Hal Roach Studios short films
Metro-Goldwyn-Mayer short films
Films with screenplays by H. M. Walker
American comedy short films
1927 short films
1920s American films